New Heavy is the second studio album by Dub Trio. It was released on ROIR on May 23, 2006. "Not Alone" features Mike Patton on vocals.

Critical reception

Brian Howe of Pitchfork said, "For now, they're talented musicians welding durable dub onto tired post-hardcore with very mixed results." John Bergstrom of PopMatters commented that "New Heavy isn't just a noble undertaking, it's an ambitious one full of pitfalls. Ron Hart of Billboard wrote, "Dub Trio's attempts to fuse metal guitars and echodelic riddims fall right on the money in the studio." David Downs of East Bay Express called the album "Perfect for boozy barbecues, fast driving, and late-night living-room after-parties."

Track listing

Notes
 The enhanced CD edition includes videos for "Illegal Dub" and "Casting Out the Nines (Live)".

Personnel
Credits adapted from liner notes.

Dub Trio
 Stu Brooks – bass guitar, keyboards, effects, production
 DP Holmes – guitar, keyboards, effects, production
 Joe Tomino – drums, percussion, keyboards, melodica, effects, production

Additional personnel
 Mike Patton – vocals (on "Not Alone")
 Joel Hamilton – production, engineering, mixing
 Joseph Yoon – executive production
 Doug Henderson – mastering
 Richard Bloom – artwork
 Jason Fried – video

References

External links
 

2006 albums
Dub Trio albums
ROIR albums